Anmado or Anma Island is an island off the coast of South Jeolla Province (Jeollanam-do), South Korea. Anmado covers an area of 6.09 km² and is home to approximately 200 residents. The landscape features several peaks: Mount Dwit (Dwitsan) (177 m), Peak Mak (Makbong) (167 m), and Mount Geon (Geonsan) (145 m). Anmado is suited for agriculture, and many of its residents work as farmers. Its main agricultural products include rice, wheat, corn, garlic, bean, sesame, and pepper. There is currently one elementary school located on the island.

Overview
The topography of Anmado forms the shape of a saddle. In the Korean language, Anma means a kind of saddle. It borders with the North Jeolla Province (Jeollabuk-do) on the northwest part of Jeollanam-do.

References 

Yeonggwang County
Islands of South Jeolla Province
Islands of the Yellow Sea